The Pasir Salak Historical Complex is a historical complex in Pasir Salak, Perak Tengah District, Perak, Malaysia.

History
The historical complex was opened in 2004.

Architecture
The historical complex sits in the traditional Malay houses. It features various memorials erected to honor Malaysian heroes, as well as watch tower, stage, cannon etc. It overlooks the Perak River.

Opening time
The historical complex opens everyday from 9:30 a.m. to 5:00 p.m.

See also
 History of Malaysia

References

2004 establishments in Malaysia
Buildings and structures in Perak
Perak Tengah District